Joey Pendleton was a Democratic member of the Kentucky Senate, representing the 3rd District from 1993 through 2013. He previously served as Minority Whip. The 3rd district, according to redistricting legislation passed during the 2013 Extraordinary Session, includes Christian, Logan, and Todd counties.

Pendleton has served as chairman of the legislature's Tobacco Task Force, Pendleton was an advocate for tobacco growers and their financial interests. He also worked to promote agricultural diversity, and championed legislation to permit the agricultural and industrial development of the controversial hemp plant (which ultimately passed the Kentucky Senate in the 2013 Regular Session).

He has served on the Health & Welfare Committee. In 1998, he received the "Better Life Government Award" from the Kentucky Association of Health Care Facilities for support of legislation that created a state income tax deduction for long-term care insurance. The Brain Injury Association of Kentucky awarded Pendleton with the "S.T.A.R." Award in 1998 establishing the Traumatic Brain Injury Trust Fund. Pendleton serves as Project Manager for the Murray State University School of Agriculture. He was also named Outstanding Young Dairyman for the Southeastern United States in 1977 and received the 4-H Alumni Award in 1989. In 1996, he received the Distinguished Service Award from the Kentucky Association of Conversation Districts. Prior to his tenure in the Senate, Pendleton also served three years as a magistrate on the County Fiscal court in the county where he lives, Christian County Kentucky.

External links
Kentucky Legislature - Senator Joey Pendleton official government site
Project Vote Smart - Senator Joseph Allen 'Joey' Pendleton (KY) profile
Follow the Money - Joey Pendleton
2008 2006 2004 2002 2000 1996 1994 campaign contributions
KentuckyVotes.org - Sen. Joey Pendleton bills introduced and voting record

Kentucky state senators
1946 births
Living people
People from Hopkinsville, Kentucky